"You Know My Name" is a song by South Korean Trot musician Jang Minho. It was released on Jang's first trot regular album Drama in 2017.

Song information 
You know my name in Korean (내 이름 아시죠) is the same translation of a gospel song 'He knows my name'. Jang seems to have been influenced because he is a Christian. The lyrics is a first person perspective talking to 'you', so it was translated to You know my name in English instead of He knows my name. 

This song was written by Jang Minho, missing his deceased father, and composed with Yoo Jongwoon. It is the fourth track of Jang's first trot regular album, Drama. At the time of release, nothing other than the title song was known. During the recording of Romantic Call center he revealed that it was the first time singing in front of the audience because the song makes him too emotional to perform. The audience who requested this song also became a topic because she was 100 years old and a huge fan of Jang Minho's. After the live performance at the Romantic Call center in September 2020, when performing this song in front of fans again at an online concert in February 2021, Jang could not control his emotions and had to stop the performance once. In the reality show God father, which has been airing since October 2021, 'Everyone has someone who gave you a name and we want the loved ones are not lonely when they leave this world', Jang explained the meaning of lyrics and sang the song to God father Kim Kap-soo. Kim expressed his feelings that he was heartbroken while listening to the song. The song was also sung at Jang's concert, and Kim Kap-soo's tearful expression at the concert was caught on camera.

Live performance 
This song entered the charts three years after its release. It became a hot topic when it was introduced to the popular show Romantic Call Center, which recorded the highest ratings every week. The video of this song's live performance hits 5.9 million views on YouTube. It is renewing 2.7 million views on Jang's personal channel and 3.2 million views on show's official channel.

Credits and personnel 
Personnel as listed in the album's liner notes are.

Musicians

 Composed by Jang Minho, Yoo Jongwoon
 Written by Jang Minho
 Arranged by Yoo Jongwoon
 Guitar : Ham Choonho
 Bass : Shin Hyungwon
 Drum : Kang Sooho
 Keyboard : Jeon Youngho
 Chorus : Kim Hyuna
 Sohaegeum: Park Sungjin
 Produced by Shin Hoonchul, Jang Minho

Technical

 Recording and mixing : Park Mu-il, Choi Namjin

Release history

References

External links 
 

2017 songs
Trot songs